Amarna letter EA 323, titled: A Royal Order for Glass, is a smaller, square, mostly flat clay tablet letter written on both sides, but only half of the reverse; it is also written on the bottom, and is a letter from 'governor' Yidya, and is a short letter like many of his other Amarna letters, numbered EA 320 to EA 326.

EA 323 is so short that it can be described as: a prostration formula to the Pharaoh (the letter is written to the King/Pharaoh), a statement of him guarding his city-state of Ashkelon-(Ašqaluna of the letters), and the subject of delivering glass to the King of Egypt.

The clay tablet letter is located at the British Museum, no. BM 29836. (Obverse, see here:)

The Amarna letters, about 300, numbered up to EA 382, are a mid 14th century BC, about 1350 BC and 20–25 years later, correspondence. The initial corpus of letters were found at Akhenaten's city Akhetaten, in the floor of the Bureau of Correspondence of Pharaoh; others were later found, adding to the body of letters.

The letter

EA 323: "A Royal Order for Glass"
EA 323, letter four of seven. (Not a linear, line-by-line translation, and English from French.)

Obverse:

(Lines 1-5)--To the king, my lord, my god, my Sun, the Sun from the sky: Message of Yidya, your servant, the dirt at your feet, the groom of your horses.
(6-13)--I indeed prostrate myself, on the back and on the stomach, at the feet of the king, my lord, 7 times and 7 times. I am indeed guarding the [pl]ace of the king, my lord and the city of the king(Ashkelon), in accordance with the command of the king, my lord, the Sun from the sky.
(13-16)--As to the king, my lord's having ordered some glass, I [her]ewith send to the k[ing], my [l]ord, 30 (pieces) of glass.

Bottom & Reverse:

(17-23)--Moreover, who is the dog that would not obey the orders of the king, my lord, the Sun fr[o]m the sky, the son of the Sun, [wh]om the Sun loves?--(complete, Obverse & Reverse, lines 1-23)

Akkadian text
The Akkadian language text:

Obverse:

(Line 1)--A-na 1.-dišLUGAL EN-ia,.. DINGIR.MEŠ.ia,..--(To King-Lord-mine,.. (of) God(s)(pl)-mine,.. )
(2)--d"UTU"-ia,.. dUTU ša iš-tu--(God-"SUN-god"-mine,.. God-SUN-god,.. which from,.. )
(3)--An-ša10-me umma 1.-dišYi-iD-iYa,.. ("God-Heaven(God-Šamû)",.. "Message" 1.-Yidya,.. )
(4)--ARAD-ka,.. "ip-ri",.. "ša" 2.-dišGÌR.MEŠ.ka,.. (Servant-yours,.. "Dust",.. "which at" 2.-Feet(pl)-yours,.. )
(5)--LÚ qar-tab-bi,.. ša ANŠE.KUR.RA.MEŠ-ka,..--(..(the) Groom,.. "which of" Horses-yours,.. )
(6)--ana 2.-dišGÌR.MEŠ,.. LUGAL-EN-ia,.. lu-ú,..(..at 2.-feet(pl),.. King-Lord-mine,.. "May it be",.. )
(7)--"iš-ta-ha-hi-in",.. 7.-diš it-šu,..(.."I prostrate myself",.. 7 times,.. )

(Line 1)--(Ana 1.LUGAL ENBēlu-ia,.. (of) DINGIR.MEŠ(pl))-ia,.. )
(2)--(D-"UTU"-ia,.. D-UTU,.. ša ištu,.. ) 
(3)--("DINGIR-Šamû",.. "Umma" 1.-Yidya,.. )
(4)--(ARAD-ka,.. "eperu",.. "ša" 2.-šēpu.meš-ka,.. )
(5)--(..kartappu/(qartabbu),.. ša sīsû(ANŠE.KUR.RA.MEŠ(pl),.. )
(6)--(..ana 2.-šēpu.meš(pl),.. LUGAL ENBēlu-ia,.. "lú",.. )
(7)--(.."iš-ta-ha-hi-in",.. 7. it-šu,.. )

See also
Yidya
Ashkelon
Amarna letter EA 325
Amarna letters–phrases and quotations

External links
Photo (British Museum article), EA 323: Obverse
Obverse (photo only)
Triplet Photo (British Museum), EA 324, EA 323, & EA 325: Obverse photos
Line Drawing, cuneiform, and Akkadian, EA 323: Obverse & Reverse, CDLI no. P270938 (Chicago Digital Library Initiative)

References

Moran, William L. The Amarna Letters. Johns Hopkins University Press, 1987, 1992. (softcover)
 Parpola, 1971. The Standard Babylonian Epic of Gilgamesh, Parpola, Simo, Neo-Assyrian Text Corpus Project, c 1997, Tablet I thru Tablet XII, Index of Names, Sign List, and Glossary-(pp. 119–145), 165 pages.
Rainey, 1970. El Amarna Tablets, 359-379, Anson F. Rainey, (AOAT 8, Alter Orient Altes Testament 8, Kevelaer and Neukirchen -Vluyen), 1970, 107 pages.

Amarna letters
Ashkelon
Canaan